Julio César Guerra Tulena (27 September 1933 – 27 September 2022) was a Colombian surgeon and politician. A member of the Colombian Liberal Party, he first served in the Chamber of Representatives from 1991 to 1994. He was then a senator from 1994 to 2002, including a stint as President of the Senate from 1995 to 1996. He was lastly governor of the Sucre Department from 2012 to 2015.

Guerra died on 27 September 2022, his 89th birthday.

References

1933 births
2022 deaths
Members of the Chamber of Representatives of Colombia
Members of the Senate of Colombia
Presidents of the Senate of Colombia
Colombian surgeons
Colombian Liberal Party politicians
People from Córdoba Department
Colombian governors